The Live MOS sensor is a brand name of an NMOS Image sensor used by Panasonic, Olympus and Leica in their Four Thirds System DSLR manufactured since 2006. (Olympus E-330, Panasonic Lumix DMC-L1 and Leica Digilux 3).

A reviewer claims that the sensor can achieve the same image quality as CCD-based sensors while keeping energy consumption down to CMOS levels.

Due to low energy consumption, it became possible to add the live preview function to all the Four Thirds System cameras since 2006 (except the Olympus E-400, E-410, and E-500).

Also, In order to reduce the image noise problem found in the first generation of Four Thirds DSLR cameras,  (Olympus E-1, E-300, E-400 and E-500) which used FFT CCD sensors (due to smaller sensor size compared to the APS-C size), the Live MOS chip includes a noise-reduction technology.

This sensor is also used in Panasonic's Micro Four Thirds System cameras.

References

External links
News at DCViews

Image sensors